James Leroy Finigan (August 19, 1928 – May 16, 1981) was an American professional baseball player and Major League infielder. Primarily a third baseman and second baseman, he played for the Philadelphia / Kansas City Athletics (1954–1956), Detroit Tigers (1957), San Francisco Giants (1958) and Baltimore Orioles (1959).

Finigan was a native of Quincy, Illinois, who attended Quincy University and Saint Ambrose University. He broke into pro baseball in the New York Yankees' organization in 1948. After four seasons in the Yankee system, and two years performing Korean War military service, he was traded to Philadelphia in an 11-player deal that featured Vic Power on December 16, 1953. Finigan made his major league debut on April 25, 1954 against the Yankees at Connie Mack Stadium, and went on to have a successful rookie season as the A's regular third baseman.  He hit .302 in 136 games with 7 home runs, 51 runs batted in, a .421 slugging percentage, and finished second to the Yankees' Bob Grim in the American League Rookie of the Year voting.  He also was a member of the American League All-Star team.

In 1955, now playing in Kansas City, Finigan split time between second base and third base and was again named to the All-Star squad.  His batting average dropped but his run production increased.  In 150 games he hit .255 with 9 home runs and 68 RBI.  He also scored 15 more runs than the previous year.

His playing time decreased over the next four years, and his days as a regular player were over.  His final game in the big leagues was played on July 5, 1959 with Baltimore. His professional career included all or part of 14 seasons.

Career totals include 512 games played, 422 hits, 19 home runs, 168 runs batted in, 195 runs scored, a .264 batting average, and an on-base percentage of .342.

Finigan died from a heart attack in Quincy at the age of 52.

External links

Jim Finigan at Baseball Library

1928 births
1981 deaths
American League All-Stars
Baltimore Orioles players
Baseball players from Illinois
Binghamton Triplets players
Detroit Tigers players
Independence Yankees players
Joplin Miners players
Kansas City Athletics players
Major League Baseball second basemen
Major League Baseball third basemen
Norfolk Tars players
Phoenix Giants players
Philadelphia Athletics players
Quincy Hawks baseball players
Quincy Gems players
Rochester Red Wings players
San Francisco Giants players
Sportspeople from Quincy, Illinois
Vancouver Mounties players